During the 2009–10 German football season, SV Werder Bremen competed in the Bundesliga.

Season summary
After last season's poor league form, 2009–10 saw a return to business for Bremen as they finished third, qualifying for the Champions League qualifying rounds. Bremen also reached the DFB-Pokal final for the second season running, but lost to Bayern Munich.

Players

First-team squad
Squad at end of season

Left club during season

Results

Europa League

Play-off round

Werder Bremen won 8–3 on aggregate.

Group stage

Round of 32

Werder Bremen won 4–2 on aggregate.

Round of 16

Valencia 5–5 Werder Bremen on aggregate. Valencia won on away goals.

References

Notes

SV Werder Bremen seasons
SV Werder Bremen